Bernhard Gál (born 1971) is an Austrian artist, composer and musicologist.

Biography
Bernhard Gál (a.k.a. Gal) works between the categories, creating music for instruments and electro-acoustic compositions, as well as art installations. Many of his intermedia art projects and sound installations present combinations of sound, light, objects, video projections and spatial concepts. He is director of the Austrian art organization "sp ce" and runs the record label Gromoga Records. Gál's work has been presented in concerts, installations and exhibitions throughout Europe, Asia and The Americas. He has been invited to music and art festivals including Donaueschinger Musiktage Germany; Donaufestival Austria; FILE São Paulo; ICMC Berlin; Inventionen Berlin; Jeunesse Festival Vienna; MaerzMusik Berlin; MATA Festival New York; Musashino Public Art Festival Tokyo, Musicacoustica Beijing; Mutek Montreal; Nuova Consonanza Rome; New Sound, New York-Festival, NYC; Sonambiente Berlin; Soundfield Festival Chicago; Festival Stimme+, ZKM, Karlsruhe; Wien Modern Festival. He has collaborated with artists such as Yumi Kori, P. Michael Schultes, G.S. Sedlak, and Emre Tuncer. For his work, Gal has received numerous awards, including the Karl Hofer Prize Berlin 2001, a fellowship from the DAAD Artists in Berlin Programme 2003, the Austrian State Scholarship for Composition 2004, and the Outstanding Artist Award for Music of the City of Vienna 2010. His music has been made available on ca. 30 audio publications, by record labels such as Durian, Plate Lunch, Intransitive Records, Bremsstrahlung, Klanggalerie, Charhizma, and Gromoga. Currently Gál lives and works in Vienna, Austria.

Selected electroacoustic works
 "Ur-Ur", series of electro-acoustic compositions, ca. 40', 2016.
 "homesweethomes #3", 23', 2016.
 "Das himmlische Kind", 34', 2015. Book & DVD Video 'Zwischenbrücken', edition sp ce, 2015.
 "homesweethomes #2", 17', 2014.
 "homesweethomes #1", 32', 2013.
 "Void", 9', 2012.
 "earlift", 16', 2011. Book & DVD Video 'Zwischenbrücken', edition sp ce, 2015.
 "xuan zhuan", 15', 2009. CD 'same difference', Gromoga, Austria, 2010.
 "relive", series of electro-acoustic compositions, 78', 2008. CD-Version released by Gromoga, Austria, 2008.
 "solo", four electro-acoustic compositions, 4 x 20', 2007. Book & DVD Video 'Zwischenbrücken', edition sp ce, 2015.
 "Reinstallation", 74', 2006.
 "le gocce dell' uomo del campo", 7', 2004. CD 'Danza De La Muerte', Klanggalerie, Austria, 2003.
 "Dreiband", 42', 2003. Catalogue book and Audio CD 'Installations', Kehrer, 2005.
 "Made in Austria", 2002.
 "RGB", 42', 2001. CD 'relisten', Intransitive, USA, 2001. 
 "Hinaus:: In den, Wald.", 64', 2001. CD-Version released by Klanggalerie, Austria, 2004.
 "zhu shui", 7', 2001. CD 'lowercase sound', Bremsstrahlung, USA, 2002.
 "57A", 7', 2001. CD 'relisten', Intransitive, USA, 2001.
 "bestimmung darmstadt", nine voice sculptures, 41', 2000.
 "Defragmentation/blue", 56', 1998. CD-Version released by Plate Lunch, Germany, 2000.
 "bestimmung new york", 15 voice sculptures, 63', 1998. CD-Version released by Durian, Austria, 1999.
 "68th Street",  14', 1998. CD 'relisten', Intransitive, USA, 2001.

Selected instrumental works
 "Un-Un | ununtitled", for four female vocalists, 2015.
 "schwarzenberg", for piano, 2013
 "beshadowed II", for flute, violoncello, sound- and light projection, 2013.
 "flut", for bass flute and quadrophonic sound projection, 2011 (in collaboration with Belma Beslic-Gal).
 "becuadro", for brass quartet and light projection, 2008
 "behape", for 2 clarinets and sound projection, 2006
 "Klangschatten", for Chinese instruments, sound- and light projection, 2004
 "UTOO", for chamber ensemble and sound projection, 2004
 "belit", composition for chamber ensemble and light projection, 2004
 "uh-jeh-gal", for zheng, sheng and live electronics, 2004
 "vür fier", for quartertone-trumpet, guitar, sheng / xun and zheng, 2003
 "Defragmentation", for chamber ensemble, 2002
 "Mount Blanc", for (amplified) piano, 2002
 "beshadowed", for flute, violoncello, sound- and light projection, 2002
 "Of Sound and Time", for traditional Chinese instruments and three listeners, 2000

Selected exhibitions

Solo Exhibitions / Intermedia Art Projects

 Das himmlische Kind; Zurich University of the Arts (Toni Campus), Zurich, 2015
 Silence is quiet. Listening; Radio Art Project; Kunstradio, Austria, 2013
 textur #8 (premiere); Kunstverein Alte Schmiede, Vienna, 2013
 textur #7 (premiere); Institut für neue Medien, Frankfurt, 2012
 textur #6 (premiere); Kunstverein Alte Schmiede, Vienna, 2011
 earlift; KunstQuartier, Salzburg, Austria. 2011
 Sterngucker; Planetarium Judenburg, Austria, 2011
 stromlinien; KoFoMi 2010, Mittersill, Austria, 2010
 textur #5 (premiere); SESC Avenida Paulista, São Paulo, 2009
 mil águas. DMAE Gallery, Porto Alegre, Brasil, 2009
 solo. Allgemeiner Konsumverein, Braunschweig, Germany, 2009
 RGB. Alpen-Adria-Universität Klagenfurt (Austria), 2008
 solo. Lakeside Science & Technology Park, Klagenfurt (Austria), 2008
 Reinstallation. O Lugar, São Paulo, 2008
 Die Grüne Hölle. Kunstverein Alte Schmiede, Vienna, 2008
 Klangbojen, Festival Donaueschinger Musiktage, Germany, 2007
 Jukai. In collaboration with Yumi Kori. The David Winton Bell Gallery, Providence, 2007
 solo. Musik aktuell 2007, Gutenbrunn, Austria, 2007
 solo. Musik aktuell 2007, Tulln, Austria, 2007
 shinkai. In collaboration with Yumi Kori. ISE Foundation, New York City, 2006
 Reinstallation. Festival Electric Eclectics, Meaford (Canada), 2006
 Die Grüne Hölle. Festival Sonambiente, Gallery of the Austrian Embassy, Berlin, 2006
 Airport. Musikinstrumenten-Museum, Berlin, 2006
 Infinitation (Seattle). In collaboration with Yumi Kori. Center of Contemporary Art, Seattle, 2005
 Hinaus:: In den, Wald. Diapason Gallery, New York, 2005
 Defragmentation (Krems). In collaboration with Yumi Kori. Donaufestival, Krems, 2005
 Night Pulses. O.K. Centrum für Gegenwartskunst, Linz, 2004
 RGBuSW. singuhr - hoergalerie in parochial, Berlin, 2004
 Klangbojen. Musik aktuell 2003, Hanslteich, Gutenbrunn (Austria), 2003
 Klangbojen. Musik aktuell 2003, Donau-Altarm, Tulln (Austria), 2003
 Machina temporis. In collaboration with Yumi Kori. Franziskaner-Klosterruine, Berlin, 2002
 RGB. Kunstverein Alte Schmiede, Vienna, 2001
 zhu shui. Jazzatelier Ulrichsberg, Austria, 2000
 Defragmentation/red. In collaboration with Yumi Kori. Kryptonale Festival, Berlin, 2000
 Dissociated Voices. Werkstadt Graz, Graz, 2000
 Defragmentation/blue. In collaboration with Yumi Kori. Studio Five Beekman, New York, 1999

Group Exhibitions

 sprachklanggesetzt; Festival EUROPA, Arena, Vienna, 2015
 Alsógál; Sound Art Group Exhibition 'On the Edge of Perceptibility', Kunsthalle Budapest, 2014
 Revelator | Boxed Secret | Neon Pier; Sheila Johnson Design Center, New York City, 2014
 It's like...; Group Exhibition 'Ueber das Scheitern'; enter: Raum für Kunst, Salzburg, 2013
 homesweethomes; Espace Projet, Montreal, 2013
 Sterngucker; Festival Sláturtíð, Reykjavík Art Museum, Iceland, 2011
 vibrate space, Festival Coded Cultures, Vienna, 2011
 RGB. das weisse haus, Vienna, 2010
 enelten. Area 53, Vienna, 2010
 Reinstallation. Festival Musicacoustica, Beijing, 2007
 Hyohaku-no-Hakobune. In collaboration with Yumi Kori. Kobe Bienal, Kobe, 2007
 Shinkai. In collaboration with Yumi Kori. Japan Society, New York City, 2007
 Hinaus:: In den, Wald. Galeria Vermelho, São Paulo, 2007
 RADIO EARS (textur #2). Magyar Muehely Galéria, Budapest, 2007
 Infinitation (São Paulo). In collaboration with Yumi Kori. SESC Pinheiros, São Paulo, 2006
 RGB. Klangturm, St. Poelten, Austria, 2006
 Defragmentation (ISCP). In collaboration with Yumi Kori. ISCP, New York City, 2005
 soundbagism. Denver International Airport, USA, 2004
 Oelbilder. Festival Reservoir VIII. Grosser Wasserspeicher, Berlin, 2004
 Three Whites. Sound Art Exhibition ‘Rock’s Role‘, Art in General, New York, 2004
 zhu shui. MATA-Festival. Gallery ‘GAle GAtes et al.’ New York, 2003
 Green Voice / Green Box. In collaboration with Yumi Kori. Musashino, Tokyo, 2002
 enelten. Sound Off Festival. Galéria Umenia, Nové Zámky, Slowakia, 2002
 I am sHitting in a room. Durian-Festival. Konzerthaus, Wien, 2002
 Hinaus:: In den, Wald. Sammlung Essl, Klosterneuburg (Austria), 2001
 bestimmung darmstadt. Museum Institut Mathildenhöhe, Darmstadt, 2000
 NYC Subway. Jonathan Shorr Gallery, New York City, 1998

Discography

Main publications

Zwischenbrücken (Book & DVD, edition sp ce/Gromoga, 2015)
same difference (Gromoga, 2010)
relive (Gromoga, 2008)
Installations (DVD version) (Gromoga, 2007)
Installations (CD version) (Gromoga, 2005)
going round in serpentines (with Kai Fagaschinski, Charhizma, 2005)
Installations (catalogue book and Audio CD) (Kehrer, 2005)
Hinaus:: In den, Wald. (Klanggalerie, 2004)
relisten (Intransitive, 2001)
Defragmentation/blue (Plate Lunch, 2000)
bestimmung New York (Durian, 1999)

Selected Compilations and Catalogue CDs

Web release 'Autumn Soundscapes Vol.2' (Mandorla Records, Mexico, 2014)
CD 'Black and White Statements' (Gramola, Austria, 2013)
Web release 'Somewhere on the edge' (Gruenrekorder, Germany, 2012)
Book/DVD 'singuhr 1996-2006' (Kehrer, Germany, 2010)
CD 'Sudamerica Electronica 3' (Sudamerica Electronica, Argentine, 2010)
DVD 'stadtklaenge | klangstaetten' (Allgemeiner Konsumverein Braunschweig, Germany, 2009)
CD 'Sound Art: Beyond Music, Between Media.' (Rizzoli, USA 2007)
CD 'henri chopin remixed' (Extraplatte, Austria 2006)
CD 'triMIX' (Innova Recordings, USA 2006)
CD '90 Sekunden Wirklichkeit' (DEGEM/Cybele, Germany 2005)
Catalogue & CDR 'Night Pulses' (O.K Center for Contemporary Art, Austria 2004)
DVD 'Text & Language' (Aspect, Magazine of New Media Art, USA 2004)
CD 'Rock’s Role (After Ryoanji)' (Art in General, USA 2004)
CD 'Intransitive Twenty-Three' (Intransitive Recordings, USA 2004)
CD 'Danza De La Muerte' (Klanggalerie, Austria 2003)
CD 'Typewriting Aloud. Typos Allowed' (SOUND OFF-FestivalSlovakia 2002)
CD 'lowercase sound 2002' (Bremsstrahlung, USA 2002)
CD 'because tomorrow comes #4' (because tomorrow comes, Germany 2001)
CD 'klanggesetz' (Initiative Minderheiten, Austria 2000)
Catalogue & CDR 'Dissociated Voices' (Werkstadt Graz, Austria 2000)
CD 'Beams and Waves' (Sound Off Festival, Slovakia 2000)

Awards
 2016 Austrian State Scholarship for Composition
 2010 Outstanding Artist Award for Music, City of Vienna
 2010 Acquisition Award of the State Art Collection of Austria
 2009 Research Fellowship, University Mozarteum, Salzburg
 2006 The New Austrian Sound of Music (travel award) 2006-07, Austrian Foreign Ministry
 2004 Austrian State Scholarship for Composition
 2003 Theatre Award “Intercultural Accents 2003”, Vienna (with X. Hu)
 2003 DAAD Artists in Berlin Program (annual fellowship), Berlin
 2002 Artist-in-Residency, Hotel Pupik, Austria
 2002 Jahresstipendium (annual grant), SKE-Fonds, Vienna
 2001 Karl-Hofer-Prize, University of the Arts, Berlin
 2001 The ar+d award (recognition), The Architectural Review, London (with Y. Kori)
 2000 Artist-in-Residency, Werkstadt Graz, Graz
 2000 Composition Award, Initiative Minderheiten, Vienna
 1999 Max-Brand-Prize, Austria (recognition)
 1999 Research Fellowship, University of Vienna

Sources
  - Interview with Bernhard Gal, Music Information Center Austria, 2011
 Festival Sonambiente - Bernhard Gál biography, 2006
 MICA - composer's entry at the Music Information Center Austria.
 Basis Wien, Austria - information about Bernhard Gal's intermedia art projects and sound installations at Basis Wien, Austria.
 Anderson, Christine. 2004. "Berlin für ein Jahr: Gastkomponisten des DAAD—Soo-Jung Shin, Jean-Luc Hervé, Bernhard Gál", edited by Carolin Naujocks. Positionen: Beiträge zur Neuen Musik, no. 61 (November): 42–45.
 Fischer, Tobias. 2007. "Interview with Bernhard Gal". www.tokafi.com, Germany, July 2007.
 Grundmann, Heidi. 2000. "Dissociated Voices (Werkeinführung)", in: Catalogue „Dissociated Voices“, Werkstadt Graz, Austria 2000.
 Lendl, Klemens. 2004. "Auf Horchposten", hi!tech Magazin, Austria, April 2004.
 Metzger, Christoph. 2006. "Klangbojen", in: „Sonoric Perspectives. Ostseebiennale der Klangkunst“, Saarbrücken 2006.
 Montgomery, Will. 2004. "Lost in translation". The Wire, UK, March 2004.
 Schöny, Roland. 2004. "Night Pulses (Werkeinführung)", in: Catalogue „Night Pulses“, O.K Centrum für Gegenwartskunst, Linz 2004.
 Weckwerth, Georg. "Soundkunst Österreich", in: „spike art quarterly“, Vienna 2006.

External links
 www.bernhardgal.com - Official website of Bernhard Gál. Calendar of events, biography, sound excerpts and relevant links:
 Complete list of works
 Information on Gal's upcoming and past exhibitions
 CDs
 sp ce, Austrian art organisation
 shut up and listen!, Interdisciplinary Festival for Music and Sound Art, Vienna
  - Interview with Bernhard Gal, published by the music information center Austria (mica), April 2011 (in German)
 Sound Field 04 Chicago New and Experimental Music Festival (October 1–31, 2004)
 Tokafi-Interview - Interview with Bernhard Gal
 Sands-Zine - Feature article - Feature article about Bernhard Gal (in Italian)
 Gromoga
 edition sp ce
 Klanggalerie

Austrian male composers
Austrian composers
Hungarian composers
Hungarian male composers
People from Leopoldstadt
Austrian people of Hungarian descent
1971 births
Living people